Tamarix tetrandra is a species of flowering plant in the family Tamaricaceae, native to south eastern Europe, Turkey, Bulgaria and Crimea. Racemes of pale pink flowers are produced in late spring.

The binomial Tamarix tetrandra means "four-stamen tamarisk".

This plant is particularly associated with temperate coastal areas, but can also be grown inland in a sunny position with protection from winter winds. It has gained the Royal Horticultural Society's Award of Garden Merit.

References

tetrandra
Flora of Europe
Flora of Bulgaria
Flora of the Crimean Peninsula
Flora of Turkey
Flora of Ukraine
Plants described in 1808